Six O'Clock News is a 1996 documentary film by Ross McElwee about television news in the United States, the randomness of fate, the anxiety of parenting, and the difference between representation and reality.
The film is the subject of scholarly study.

References

External links
 Ross McElwee's web page
 
 

1996 documentary films
1996 films
American documentary films
Documentary films about journalism
Films directed by Ross McElwee
Documentary films about television
1990s English-language films
1990s American films